Lasionycta staudingeri is a moth of the family Noctuidae. It can be found from Oppland to Finland and Norway in Europe, as well as Siberia and North America.

The species is diurnal and flies over dry scree tundra.

The wingspan is 21–27 mm. The moths fly from June to July.

The larvae feed on Taraxacum and Empetrum species.

Subspecies
Lasionycta staudingeri staudingeri (Eurasia)
Lasionycta staudingeri preblei (across northern North America from Baffi n Island to western Alaska and southward to 60° North. Its range extends into northeastern Siberia at least as far as the Kolyma River)

External links
A Revision of Lasionycta Aurivillius (Lepidoptera, Noctuidae) for North America and notes on Eurasian species, with descriptions of 17 new species, 6 new subspecies, a new genus, and two new species of Tricholita Grote

Lasionycta
Moths of North America
Moths of Europe
Insects of the Arctic
Moths described in 1891